Osteochilus flavicauda is a species of cyprinid fish endemic to the Malay Peninsula.

References

Taxa named by Maurice Kottelat
Fish described in 2009
Osteochilus